Robert Osborne (4 February 1897 – 21 February 1975) was an Australian cricketer. He played three first-class matches for New South Wales between 1924/25 and 1926/27.

See also
 List of New South Wales representative cricketers

References

External links
 

1897 births
1975 deaths
Australian cricketers
New South Wales cricketers
Cricketers from Sydney